The Bhutan Football Federation (Dzongkha: འབྲུག་རྐང་རིལ་ཚོགས་སྡེ།) is the governing body of football in Bhutan, controlling Bhutan national football team, Bhutan women's national football team and Bhutan national futsal team. It is also responsible for organising Bhutan Premier League, BPL Qualifiers, Dzongkhag (District) leagues, Women's National League, National Futsal – Minifootball league, as well as various youth and recreational tournaments.

History
The Bhutan Football Federation was founded in 1983 as part of the Bhutan Olympic Committee. It has been a member of FIFA since 2000 and the Asian Football Confederation since 1993.

The Bhutan national football team was considered "the worst football team" up until 2015 when it won a World Cup qualifying game against Sri Lanka.

In 2016, the BFF introduced Club Licensing Regulation to bring basic standards to the football economy of the country.

In July 2017, the BFF Disciplinary Committee suspended Druk Pol F.C. for two years after a player disobeyed a referee during a match.

Prizes
2016: AFC aspiring member association of the year

References

External links
 Official website
 Bhutan at FIFA site
 Bhutan at AFC site

Football in Bhutan
1983 establishments in Bhutan
Bhutan
Sports organizations established in 1983
Sports governing bodies in Bhutan